Britta Margareta Marakatt-Labba (born September 18, 1951, in Idivuoma, Karesuando, Sweden) is a Swedish Sámi textile artist, painter, graphic artist, and a member of the Máze Group.

Early life and education
Marakatt-Labba is one of nine children born into a reindeer-herding family. When she was five, her father Johannes Marakatt died, leaving her mother Anna Maria Nutti to raise nine children by herself. She studied at Sunderby Folk High School from 1971 to 1973. From 1974 to 1978, Marakatt-Labba studied at the Art Industrial School in Gothenburg, Sweden from which she graduated with a Bachelor's Degree in Textile Art. From 1999 to 2002, she studied at the Sámi University of Applied Sciences in Kautokeino, Norway.

In 2014, she received an honorary doctorate from the Faculty of Arts at Umeå University.

Career
While Marakatt-Labba works with numerous types of media, it is primarily her narrative embroidery using motifs from the Sámi culture and mythology that she is known for around the world. In addition to textiles, she works with watercolors and lithographs. She has also illustrated numerous books and designed costumes and sets for plays.

In connection with the Álta conflict in the 1970s, Marakatt-Labba created the embroidered narrative Garjját (The Crows), which depicted crows landing downhill from Sámi protestors sitting outside of their goahti and turning into black-clad policemen as they marched up the hill to the protestors. She joined the Máze Group: the Sámi Artists’ Group in 1978 and was involved in creating the Sami Artists' Union founded a year later in 1979.

From 2003 to 2007, Marakatt-Labba created a piece entitled Historjá that tells the history and mythology of the Sámi people. This epic 23.5 m long textile artwork is normally displayed in the Non-Experimental Sciences building at the University of Tromsø, although it has also been exhibited as part of documenta 14 in Kassel, Germany in 2017.

Awards 
 1993 – The Anna Nordlander Prize
 2000 – The Rubus arcticus Award
 2011 – The Asa Kitok Scholarship
 2012 – The Kauppi Scholarship
 2015 – The Per Gannevik Award
 2017 – The John Savio Award
 2017 – Illis Quorum
 2018 – The Västerbottens-Kuriren's cultural award
 2019 – Stig Dagerman Prize
 2020 – Prince Eugen Medal

Bibliography 

 Jan-Erik Lundström (ed.): Broderade berättelser. Britta Marakatt-Labba, Koncentrat, Kiruna 2010,

References 

1951 births
Living people
Swedish Sámi people
Sámi artists
People from Kiruna Municipality
Swedish textile artists
20th-century women textile artists
20th-century textile artists
20th-century Swedish women artists
20th-century Swedish artists
21st-century women textile artists
21st-century textile artists
21st-century Swedish women artists
21st-century Swedish artists
Recipients of the Illis quorum
Swedish embroiderers